Princess Cays is a tourist resort at the southern end of the island of Eleuthera, Bahamas. It is owned by Carnival Corporation, which owns Princess Cruises, among others. Carnival Corporation also owns nearby Half Moon Cay. Contrary to the implication of its name, it is located on Eleuthera, rather than on separate islands.

Late January 28, 2019, a fire ignited at a generator, causing damage to the resort.

Geography 
Princess Cays is located approximately 50 miles (80 km) from Nassau, Bahamas.

Visitors can go swimming, canoeing, kayaking, banana boating, water skiing, snorkeling, parasailing, sailboating, or waverunning. There are also volleyball and basketball courts. Cabanas are available for daily rental. English is spoken and US currency is used.

Climate 
The island has a tropical climate, with little seasonal variation. The dry season is in winter, while summer is often the wet season with daily thunderstorms.

References

Resorts in the Bahamas
Princess Cruises